The superior alveolar artery may refer to:

 The posterior superior alveolar artery, a branch of the maxillary artery that serves the upper teeth and other related structures
 The anterior superior alveolar arteries, branches of the infraorbital artery, also supplying the upper teeth and related structures
 The middle superior alveolar artery, see Maxillary artery